Chancellor is a historic canal tugboat located at Waterford, New York.  It was built in 1938 by the Ira S. Bushey & Sons Shipyard of Brooklyn, New York.  She measures  in length,  in beam, and  depth of hold.  She was designed for use on the New York State Barge Canal.

It was listed on the National Register of Historic Places in 2000.

The Tug Chancellor is owned and operated by the Waterford Maritime Historical Society, based in Waterford, New York. In 2017 she took on water and sunk up to her wheelhouse, leaving her future in limbo.

References

External links

Waterford Maritime Historical Society

Buildings and structures in Saratoga County, New York
Ships on the National Register of Historic Places in New York (state)
1938 ships
Museum ships in New York (state)
National Register of Historic Places in Saratoga County, New York
Tugboats of the United States
Maritime incidents in 2017